This is a list of American films released in 2014.

Box office
The highest-grossing American films released in 2014, by domestic box office gross revenue, are as follows:

January–March

April–June

July–September

October–December

See also
 2014 in American television
 2014 in the United States

References

External links

 
 List of 2014 box office number-one films in the United States

2014
Lists of 2014 films by country or language
Films